This is a list of wineries in the Clare Valley, a major wine-producing region located within the Clare Valley in South Australia. There are an estimated 50 wineries in the region.

See also

South Australian wine
List of wineries in South Australia
List of wineries in the Barossa Valley
List of wineries in the Eden Valley

References

External links
Wine Diva
Clare Museum: History of Clare Valley Wineries

Clare Valley
Wineries in the Clare Valley
Clare Valley